Khorus Darreh (also Romanized as Khorūs Darreh, Kharūs Darreh, Khoroos Darreh, and Khurus Darreh) is a village in Shahidabad Rural District, Central District, Avaj County, Qazvin Province, Iran. At the 2006 census, its population was 247, in 70 families.

References 

Populated places in Avaj County